Type 4 20 mm twin AA machine cannon was an Imperial Japanese Army (IJA) anti-aircraft gun.  It consisted of two Type 98 20 mm AA machine cannon.  It was introduced in 1944 and approximately 500 guns were produced.

The Type 98 20 mm AA machine cannon was the most common light anti-aircraft gun of the Japanese military and the IJA used it until the end of World War II.

References

Notes

Sources
  War Department TM-E-30-480 Handbook on Japanese Military Forces, September 1944.
 Taki's Imperial Japanese Army Page: Type 4 20 mm twin AA Machine Cannon - Akira Takizawa
 Taki's Imperial Japanese Army Page: Type 98 20mm AA Machine Cannon - Akira Takizawa

World War II anti-aircraft guns
Anti-aircraft guns of Japan
World War II weapons of Japan
20 mm artillery
Weapons and ammunition introduced in 1944